Carabus masuzoi is a species of ground beetle, family of Carabidae. It is endemic to Taiwan, and was first found in mid-altitude mountains of central Taiwan. Its body is black colored with longitudinal indents on its elytra, and is capable of flight. Its morphology differs between different habitat types.

References

masuzoi
Beetles of Asia
Insects of Taiwan
Endemic fauna of Taiwan
Beetles described in 1989